John Malcolm Duhé Jr. (born April 7, 1933) is an inactive Senior United States circuit judge of the New Orleans-based United States Court of Appeals for the Fifth Circuit.

Family

Education and career

Duhé received his Bachelor of Arts degree from Tulane University in New Orleans in 1955 and his Juris Doctor from the Tulane University Law School in 1957. He served as an attorney in private practice in New Iberia, Louisiana from 1957 to 1978.

Judicial career

State court service
From 1979 to 1984, Duhé was judge of the Louisiana 16th Judicial District in New Iberia.

Federal judicial service 
Duhé was nominated by President Ronald Reagan on May 15, 1984, to a seat on the United States District Court for the Western District of Louisiana vacated by Judge W. Eugene Davis. He was confirmed by the United States Senate on June 8, 1984, and received commission on June 11, 1984. His service terminated on November 9, 1988, due to elevation to the Fifth Circuit.

Duhé was nominated by President Reagan on June 27, 1988, to a seat on the United States Court of Appeals for the Fifth Circuit vacated by Judge Albert Tate Jr. Duhé was confirmed by the Senate on October 14, 1988, and received commission on October 17, 1988. He assumed senior status on April 7, 1999. He took inactive senior status in 2011.

Duhé's law clerks included Kyle Duncan of the United States Court of Appeals for the Fifth Circuit.

References

Sources
 

1933 births
20th-century American judges
Judges of the United States Court of Appeals for the Fifth Circuit
Judges of the United States District Court for the Western District of Louisiana
Living people
Louisiana lawyers
Louisiana Republicans
Louisiana state court judges
People from Lafayette, Louisiana
People from New Iberia, Louisiana
Tulane University Law School alumni
United States court of appeals judges appointed by Ronald Reagan
United States district court judges appointed by Ronald Reagan